The Italian American Museum of Los Angeles (Italian: "Museo Italo Americano di Los Angeles" and abbreviated IAMLA) is a museum located in downtown Los Angeles, California, and is part of the El Pueblo de Los Ángeles Historical Monument. It is dedicated to the history, experience and continuing contributions of Italian Americans and Italians in Southern California and the United States, and is the first such museum in Southern California. The museum opened in 2016 and has presented historical exhibits on Italians in Los Angeles, including Sunshine and Struggle and a variety of educational and cultural events.

Overview
The museum is located in the Italian Hall, a historic building listed on the National Register of Historic Places constructed in 1908 to serve as the cultural center for the Italian community.  Located on the south edge of Chinatown in what was formerly the core of the city's Italian enclave, the Italian Hall was the site of countless events such as weddings, meetings and concerts. Today, the Italian Hall is the oldest surviving structure from Los Angeles' little Italy.

History
The museum project was first conceived in 1988 soon after which a support group was formed to raise  funds to develop a museum.  In the project's first phase, nearly $2 million was raised to restore the Hall.
The Museum is funded by the Historic Italian Hall Foundation, a non-profit organization incorporated in 1993, the City of Los Angeles and hundreds of donors.

Exhibits
Italian American Museum is an interactive museum documenting the history and ongoing contributions of Italian Americans through exhibitions and a variety of programming.  It features historical and art exhibitions, an oral history and a research archive. 
The IAMLA’s award-winning permanent exhibition explores the history of Italian Americans in the United States and is also presented online via the Google Cultural Institute Check the online exhibition here. 
Previous temporary exhibitions include "Sunshine and Struggle: The Italian American Experience in Los Angeles, 1827-1927", which showcased hundreds of never-before-published photographs and historical artifacts pertaining to the Italian American presence in Los Angeles. The exhibit has since traveled to the Capital Museum in Sacramento and to San Pedro, California. The work of Leo Politi was exhibited in 2019. The Sicilian Cart: History in Movement, the result of a collaboration between the IAMLA, the MUSCA Museum of Sicily, and Dolce & Gabbana; Italianità: Artists of the Italian Diaspora Examine Identity, which featured a century of work from renowned artists such as Joseph Stella; Leo Politi’s Los Angeles: Works of Love and Protest, an exhibition of work by the Caldecott Award-winning author and illustrator; Fantasy World: Italian Americans in Animation; and St. Joseph’s Tables: Expressions of Devotion, Charity, and Abundance. Woven Lives: Exploring Women's Needlework from the Italian Diaspora examined the evolution of needlework, tracing its origins in Italy and examining its significance in Italian and Italian American life. A Real Boy: the Many Lives of Pinocchio (on view until October 2023) explores the cultural origins, adaptations, and enduring appeal of one of the most popular characters in children’s literature. A Real Boy: The Many Lives of Pinocchio is presented in collaboration and with the support of California Arts Council; Fondazione Nazionale Carlo Collodi; Walt Disney Archives; University of California Los Angeles; Costumi Tirelli S.p.A.; Italian Cultural Institute Los Angeles; Italian Consulate General Los Angeles; Los Angeles County Department of Arts and Culture and City of Los Angeles Department of Cultural Affairs.
The IAMLA won the Excellence in History and Preservation Award from the American Association for State and Local History in 2017 and has been recognized by the state of California.
The IAMLA hosts many events annually, including free family workshops, film screenings, lectures, and concerts. Among the public programs that the IAMLA has presented are “H.E.A.T., Healthy Eating Ambassadors in Training,” a program that teaches underserved populations how to eat healthfully on a budget; “Sotto le Stelle,” a free, alfresco concert for families; “Cooking with the IAMLA,” a series of culinary educational videos presented online; various craft workshops, including mask and memory lantern-making; “California Italians, Italian Californians” a conference at UCLA; “A Boat for Peppe,” a reading of Leo Polit’s eponymously titled book accompanied by live music; and dozens of book presentations, lectures, and screenings, as well as free curricula.

Events
Each year, the museum sponsors the annual fundraiser Taste of Italy Los Angeles, a celebration of Italian American and Italian history, cuisine, and culture, which takes place in October and draws thousands of participants. Other events include the 1910s to 1940s-themed Vintage!, as well as film screenings, lectures, art programs for families and children, and live concerts.

See also

Los Angeles

References

External links
 
 Official Italian American Museum of Los Angeles website

Museums in Los Angeles
Ethnic museums in California
History museums in California
Buildings and structures in Downtown Los Angeles
El Pueblo de Los Ángeles Historical Monument
Italian-American culture in Los Angeles
Italian-American museums